Eagle Lake is a census-designated place (CDP) in Covington Township, Lackawanna County, Pennsylvania, United States. As of the 2010 census, the population was 12. At that time, of 95 total housing units, five were occupied, while the remainder were for seasonal or recreational use.

Demographics

References

Census-designated places in Lackawanna County, Pennsylvania
Census-designated places in Pennsylvania